David Bjornson (born 7 July 1947 in Selkirk, Manitoba) was a member of the House of Commons of Canada from 1988 to 1993, serving in the 34th Canadian Parliament for the Progressive Conservative party in the Selkirk riding. By career, he is an electrician.

Bjornson left federal politics after being defeated by Liberal candidate Ron Fewchuk in the 1993 federal election. Amid the Tory collapse that year, Bjornson was pushed into fourth place behind Fewchuk and the New Democratic and Reform candidates.

External links
 

1947 births
Canadian people of Icelandic descent
Living people
Members of the House of Commons of Canada from Manitoba
People from Selkirk, Manitoba
Progressive Conservative Party of Canada MPs